Greencastle is a hamlet in County Tyrone, Northern Ireland. It is within the townland of Sheskinshule.

The village sits at a crossroads in the foothills of the Sperrin Mountains with the Owenkillew and Owenreagh rivers running nearby. It had a population of 153 people in the 2001 Census.

In 2012, a Real IRA training camp was discovered in the hamlet, leading to four people jailed for terrorism offences in 2014.

Sport 
An Caisleán Glas CLG made history by becoming the first club from Tyrone to win the All-Ireland Junior Club Title on Saturday 10 March 2007 in Croke Park, Dublin. They beat Duagh from Kerry 0-13 to 0-12 in an entertaining game played under floodlights.
Sperrin Og made history by becoming the first ladies club from Tyrone to win the All-Ireland Junior Club Title on Sunday 20 November 2011 in St. Peregrine's, Dublin. The beat Aherlow from Tipperary 2-09 to 1-10 in an entertaining game, in front crowd of 700 supporters.
St. Patricks, Greencastle
In 2006 Our Lady of Lourdes Primary School in Greencastle launched a Cookery Book with recipes from Ireland's top GAA players, to mark the school's 25th Anniversary and raise funds for the Cormac McAnallen Trust. Those attending the launch included Mickey Harte (Tyrone GAA manager), Stephen O'Neill (Tyrone GAA player), Séan Kelly (former Gaelic Athletic Association President), Danny Murphy (Ulster GAA Secretary), Liam McNelis (secretary of The Cormac Trust), Steven McDonnell (Armagh GAA player), Paddy Crozier (former Derry GAA manager), Brian McIver (former Donegal GAA manager), Adrian Logan (former UTV sports presenter) and Austin O'Callaghan (BBC NI).

References 

NI Neighbourhood Information Service

External links 

Greencastle Parish
Greencastle @ Omagh District Council
Greencastle GAA
Sperrin Og Ladies Gaelic Football Team
Greencastle 5

See also 
List of towns and villages in Northern Ireland

Villages in County Tyrone